My Name Is Earl is an American television sitcom created by Greg Garcia that aired on the NBC television network from September 20, 2005, to May 14, 2009, in the United States. It was produced by 20th Century Fox Television and starred Jason Lee as Earl Hickey, the title character. The series also starred Ethan Suplee, Jaime Pressly, Nadine Velazquez, and Eddie Steeples.

Most episodes from the first season, then only a few from the rest, began with Earl presenting the premise of the series:
"You know the kind of guy who does nothing but bad things and then wonders why his life sucks? Well, that was me. Every time something good happened to me, something bad was always waiting around the corner: karma. That's when I realized that I had to change. So, I made a list of everything bad I've ever done, and one by one I'm gonna make up for all my mistakes. I'm just trying to be a better person. My name is Earl."

The series ended with a cliffhanger episode to conclude Season 4, ostensibly to be resolved in Season 5, but was unexpectedly canceled.

The series storyline is rounded out in the pilot episode of Greg Garcia's next sitcom Raising Hope. The television playing in the background has a news reader stating "a small-time crook with a long list of wrongs he was making amends for has finally finished, and you'll never guess how it ended", however the television is turned off before he elaborates and no other mention is made.

Synopsis
Earl Hickey is a small-time thief, living in the fictional rural town of Camden, who loses his winning $100,000 lottery ticket after being hit by a car while he celebrates his good fortune. Lying in a hospital bed, he learns about karma during an episode of the talk show Last Call with Carson Daly. Convinced he has to turn his life around to be happy, Earl gives himself over to the power of karma. He makes a list of every bad thing that he has ever done and every person that he has ever wronged, and makes efforts to fix them all. After doing a first good deed, he finds the $100,000 lottery ticket that he had lost. Seeing this as a sign of karma rewarding him for his commitment, Earl uses his new-found wealth to do more good deeds according to his list.

Earl's wife Joy throws him out, keeping her two children herself: Dodge, whom she conceived before getting together with Earl, and Earl Jr., who was fathered during their marriage, but not by Earl. Earl moves into a motel and lives with his brother Randy, and they meet Catalina, the motel's beautiful maid who illegally emigrated from somewhere in Latin America. Earl works on the list which mostly involves strangers and old acquaintances he has wronged, but also contains items involving his family. Initially Joy plots to kill or blackmail Earl for his lottery winnings, but later gives up. Joy marries Darnell Turner, a mutual friend who works at a local restaurant called the Crab Shack, and with whom she had been having an affair. Until late in Season Four, it is generally accepted that Darnell fathered Earl Jr. In the Season One finale, Earl discovers he had bought the lotto tickets using money he stole from another person, but when he tries to return his winnings to that person, the latter is inflicted with bad karma, so he returns the money to Earl.

The second season has Earl continuing to work on his list, however, Joy gets in trouble when she steals a delivery truck and ends up kidnapping and assaulting the member of staff who was inside. Joy is arrested for felonies that would put her in prison for life because it was her third strike. To soften the jury, she decides to have a surrogate baby for her half-sister Liberty Washington and Liberty's husband Ray-Ray.  Meanwhile, Catalina has been deported.  Earl and Randy visit her home village in Latin America, and Randy marries Catalina in a green card marriage so she can return to the United States. In the season finale, Earl sacrifices himself at Joy's trial by confessing to all of her crimes and is sentenced to two years in a state penitentiary.

In the third season Earl is still imprisoned but continues to do good deeds despite not having his list on him. He meets Frank, from whom he had rented the trailer in which Joy and her husband Darnell now live, while Randy gets a job as a prison guard to be closer to Earl. Meanwhile Joy gives birth to Liberty and Ray-Ray's baby. Earl's good deeds attract the attention of the state warden, Jerry, who offers Earl a reduction in prison time for helping him resolve his issues. When Earl is about to leave, Jerry revokes Earl's reductions as he would lose such a productive helper, but Earl eventually gains the upper hand and forces Jerry to honour his early release. After leaving prison, Earl loses his confidence in the list; he has spent years and the last of his lottery winnings doing good things, but he has nothing to show for it and is insistent that karma should have given him some kind of lasting reward by now. He reverts to his old, malicious ways, doing cruel and illegal things. Frank's ex-girlfriend Billie Cunningham hits Earl with her car and puts him into a coma, then is subsequently hit herself. Randy is able to revive Earl by working on the list. Earl finds Billie and marries her, thinking she is karma's reward for his years of effort. When Earl and Billie argue over the list, and  Earl chooses the list over her, Billie goes into a rampage that undoes his good deeds. However, when Billie hides in the Amish-like "Camdenite" settlement, she has a change of heart. She divorces Earl and gives him the rest of her insurance settlement money, which helps him continue the list.

The fourth season goes back to focusing on Earl doing good deeds to cross off his list. A major story arc during this season was that Darnell, who is actually a former assassin from a secret government agency, blows his witness protection cover. He, Joy, and his family are forced to change identities and relocate until Darnell's father, who is also from the agency, goes on a mission with Darnell which clears Darnell's family of needing protection. In the season finale, Earl and the gang learn, from DNA test results, that Earl is actually Dodge's biological father. Earl still has not finished his list as of the season's conclusion, and there is a cliffhanger: it's proven that Darnell is not Earl Jr.'s father, revealing that Joy had another affair.

Cast

 Jason Lee as Earl Hickey, a small-time thief who turns his life around after winning money on a lottery scratcher, compiling a list of wrongs that he plans to make amends for.
 Ethan Suplee as Randy Hickey, Earl's dim-witted & lazy younger brother.
 Jaime Pressly as Joy Turner, Earl's ex-wife who lives in a trailer park. 
 Nadine Velazquez as Catalina, the maid at the motel where Earl and Randy reside.
 Eddie Steeples as Darnell Turner, a worker at the local restaurant that Earl and the gang frequent. He marries Joy in season 1.

Production

Conception
Creator and head writer Greg Garcia wrote the pilot while working on another sitcom, Yes, Dear. He initially pitched the series to Fox, which passed on it. He then approached NBC, which optioned the pilot on a cast-contingent basis, meaning they would order the pilot provided a suitable cast could be assembled. Jason Lee was approached for the lead role, but was uninterested in working in television and passed on the series twice before finally agreeing to read the pilot script. Though he liked the pilot, he was hesitant to commit to his first TV starring role until meeting with Garcia, after which he signed on to play Earl Hickey.

Locations
My Name Is Earl is set in fictional Camden County. Creator Greg Garcia says:

In the episode "BB", Earl's driver's license address is at "Pimmit Hills Trailer Park, Space C-13, Camden County", but the state is not listed. Creator Greg Garcia said that Camden County is loosely modeled on Pimmit Hills, Virginia, the neighborhood where he grew up. The filming location in Los Angeles was not a trailer park, but was built up to look like one.

Many of the locations were filmed in San Fernando Valley in California. In the season 1 episode "The Professor", Earl receives a postcard from Alex with the address "Earl Hickey, The Palms Hotel RM 231, 9005 Lincoln Blvd, Camden    USA" with Earl's hand covering up most of the postmark. The Palms Motel structure is actually a motel in North Hills, California, now named the Palm Tree Inn Motel. It was also used to film other shows and films such as Gilmore Girls, The Mentalist, and Heroes. Exterior shots of the Crab Shack and Club Chubby were also taken from locations in  Van Nuys and North Hills. Houses and shops for the various characters come from locations in Van Nuys, Santa Clarita, Northridge, Moorpark, Los Angeles, and other Southern California cities. In the episode "Didn't Pay Taxes", Earl and Randy climb the landmark Artesia water tower, although they do not refer to it by name.

Other episodes have listed states that were unlikely to have Camden County.  In the episode "Our Other Cops is On", officer Stuart Daniels states that his surveillance equipment was "supposed to go to Camden, New Jersey, but came here instead". In "Earl and Joy's Anniversary", when killer bees have invaded Camden and then left, Iqball says that the bees are heading for Texas. The flashback episodes "Inside Probe" describe Camden County as trying to stay independent during the American Civil War and forming its own country called Central, which lasted less than a day. In episode "Y2K", Joy states that she "may move to Florida", while in episode "BB" Randy suggests they go to Arizona.

Cancellation and future
The series ended abruptly on May 19, 2009, after running for four seasons. Season four had ended with the caption 'To Be Continued'. The series' producer, 20th Century Fox Television, approached the Fox, TBS and TNT networks to continue the series, but they were unable to come to terms without "seriously undermining the artistic integrity of the series."

In October 2011, Jason Lee told E! Online he has been in talks with Greg Garcia to finish the list via a movie, possibly to be released online.

On October 1, 2013, creator Greg Garcia participated in an "Ask Me Anything" (AMA) on Reddit. Fan Jerry Denton asked "Who was Earl Jr's. real father and did Earl ever finish the list?"
 
Garcia replied:

Critical reception
The show was well received by critics and audiences alike. One reviewer speculated that Earl's forthrightness to having led a life of idiocy is what endears him to the viewer, and is what suggests there is a depth to his character beyond what is initially seen. Many of the negative and ambivalent reviews center on what is perceived to be base.

The series was nominated twice for Best International Programme at the British Academy Television Awards in 2007 and 2008. The pilot episode won Emmy awards for Outstanding Writing and Directing in a Comedy Series for Greg Garcia and Marc Buckland respectively at the 58th Primetime Emmy Awards. Jaime Pressly won for Outstanding Supporting Actress in a Comedy series at the 59th Primetime Emmy Awards. Other Emmy nominations include Beau Bridges and Giovanni Ribisi for Outstanding Guest Actor in a Comedy Series.

Some critics questioned if the series had been influenced by Scientology, with actors Jason Lee and Ethan Suplee being Scientologists at that time; the show also featured guest appearances from high-profile Scientologist actors including Michael Peña and Giovanni Ribisi. In 2008, Alec Baldwin publicly named Earl creator Greg Garcia as being a Scientologist; Garcia quickly denied any involvement with Scientology, claiming that the Daily Mirror had incorrectly reported him to be a Scientologist.

Episodes

Home media

Ratings

The series premiered on September 20, 2005, drew in 14.9 million viewers in the United States, earning a 6.6 rating. By the airing of the third episode it was apparent that My Name Is Earl was the highest rated of NBC's new fall offerings, and a full season (22 episodes) was ordered. In its first month, it was also the highest rated new sitcom of the season to air on any network and was the highest rated sitcom on any network in the 18–49-year-old demographic. The show was renewed for a second season (2006–07), a third (2007–08), and a fourth (2008–09).

Syndication
20th Century Fox Television has cleared My Name Is Earl in nearly 50% of the U.S., said Bob Cook, the company's president and chief operating officer. 20th had sold the off-net sitcom to the Fox, Tribune, CBS, Hearst-Argyle, and Sinclair station groups for a fall 2009 debut.

My Name Is Earl aired in off-network syndication and on TBS, Ion Television, and MyNetworkTV in the United States.
The series premiered in January 2006 on Channel 4 in the UK. The fourth season was shown on E4 in October 2008. In 2013, 5Star gained the repeat rights to  the series. The show was repeated on Comedy Central Extra from March 5, 2018.

See also
 List of My Name Is Earl episodes
 List of My Name Is Earl characters
 100 Deeds for Eddie McDowd
 Quantum Leap

References

Further reading

External links

 
 

 
2000s American single-camera sitcoms
2005 American television series debuts
American comedy-drama television series
2009 American television series endings
American crime comedy television series
English-language television shows
Karma
NBC original programming
Primetime Emmy Award-winning television series
Television series about brothers
Television series about divorce
Television series about dysfunctional families
Television series by 20th Century Fox Television
Television shows set in Los Angeles